Lincoln Trail College is a public community college in Robinson, Illinois. The college was founded in 1969 and is a member of the Illinois Eastern Community Colleges organization.

Academics
The college offers career preparation programs as well as a two-year college transfer curriculum. The college is accredited by the Higher Learning Commission.

Athletics
Intercollegiate team sports at Lincoln Trail College include baseball, basketball (men's and women's), golf, soccer, softball, and volleyball. Teams compete in the Great Rivers Athletic Conference in Region 24 of the National Junior College Athletic Association.

References

External links
 Official website
 Official athletics website

Community colleges in Illinois
Education in Crawford County, Illinois
NJCAA athletics
Educational institutions established in 1969
1969 establishments in Illinois